Columbia Township is one of the twenty-one townships of Tama County, Iowa, United States.

History
Columbia Township was organized in 1856.

References

Townships in Tama County, Iowa
Townships in Iowa